Percopsis transmontana, the sand roller, is a species of percopsiform fish endemic to the Columbia River drainage in the northwestern United States.  This species grows to a length of  TL.  Sand rollers can live up to 6 years in slow-moving, sandy-bottomed streams and rivers among vegetation. Their diet includes flies and Trichoptera, although juveniles also have been known to eat crustacean zooplankton.

References
 

Percopsiformes
Freshwater fish of the United States
Fish described in 1892